The green shrike-vireo (Vireolanius pulchellus) is a species of bird in the family Vireonidae. It is found in Belize, Colombia, Costa Rica, El Salvador, Guatemala, Honduras, Mexico, Nicaragua, and Panama. Its natural habitat is subtropical or tropical moist lowland forests.

References

green shrike-vireo
Birds of Central America
green shrike-vireo
green shrike-vireo
green shrike-vireo
Taxonomy articles created by Polbot